Friedrich Schiller – The Triumph of a Genius is a 1940 German film, based on the novel Passion by Norbert Jacques.  The film focuses on the early career of the German poet Friedrich Schiller.

The film was released in Italy under the title I masnadieri.  It was also released in Sweden and Denmark.

Cast
 Horst Caspar: Friedrich Schiller
 Hannelore Schroth: Laura Rieger
 Heinrich George: Duke Charles Eugene
 Lil Dagover: Countess Franziska von Hohenheim
 Eugen Klöpfer: Christian Friedrich Daniel Schubart
 Paul Dahlke: Sergeant Riess
 Paul Henckels: Hofmarschall von Silberkalb
 Herbert Hübner: General Rieger
 Dagny Servaes: Frau Rieger
 Hildegard Grethe: Elizabeth Schiller, Schillers Mutter
 Friedrich Kayßler: Johannes Kaspar Schiller, Schillers Vater
 Walter Franck: Fremder
 Hans Quest: Eleve Hoven
 Hans Nielsen: Georg Friedrich Scharffenstein
 Fritz Genschow: Eleve Karpff
 Franz Nicklisch: Eleve Petersen
 Ernst Schröder: Eleve Zumsteg
 Wolfgang Lukschy: Eleve Boigeol
 Just Scheu: Hauptmann der Militärakademie
 Günther Hadank: General Augé
 Hans Leibelt: Prof. Abel
 Ferdinand Terpe: Grand Duke's Court Chamberlain
 Heinz Welzel: Andreas Streicher
 Bernhard Minetti: Franz Moor
 Albert Florath: Pastor Moser
 Loriot: Page am Hof des Herzogs 
 Edmund Lorenz: Schorsch Rieß

External links

1940 films
1940s biographical films
German biographical films
Films of Nazi Germany
1940s German-language films
Films directed by Herbert Maisch
Films based on German novels
Biographical films about writers
Films set in the 1770s
Films set in the 1780s
Cultural depictions of Friedrich Schiller
German black-and-white films
1940s German films